The 2014–15 season was West Ham Uniteds third campaign in the Premier League since being promoted in the 2011–12 season. It was West Ham's 19th Premier League campaign overall.

As well as competing in the Premier League, West Ham took part in the FA Cup and the League Cup entering at the third and second rounds respectively.

Sam Allardyce started his fourth full season as West Ham manager, with Kevin Nolan captaining the team for the fourth year. It was to be their penultimate season playing at the Boleyn Ground before moving to the Olympic Stadium for the start of the 2016–17 season.

West Ham got off to a very good start in the league. The team was 3rd in the Premier League table on Christmas Day but won just 3 matches between Boxing Day and the end of the season as their form collapsed dramatically and they finished in 12th place, one position higher than the previous season. Minutes after the last game of season- a 0–2 defeat away at Newcastle, the club announced that they would not be renewing manager Allardyce's contract.

Key events 

 23 May 2014: The release of players Joe Cole, Jack Collison, George McCartney, Callum Driver and Jordan Spence is announced.
 28 May 2014: West Ham announce the signing of Argentine player Mauro Zárate from Vélez Sarsfield.
 18 June 2014: Cheikhou Kouyaté signs from Belgian champions Andrelecht on a four-year contract for an undisclosed fee.
 3 July 2014: Left back Aaron Cresswell is signed from Ipswich Town on a five-year contract for an undisclosed fee.
 8 July 2014: Midfielder Diego Poyet, Charlton Athletic's Player of the Season for 2013–14, signs on a four-year contract.
 29 July 2014: Ecuadorian Enner Valencia signs for an estimated £12 million fee from Mexican club Pachuca on a five-year contract.
 31 July 2014: Carl Jenkinson of Arsenal is signed on a season-long loan.
 14 August 2014: Senegalese forward, Diafra Sakho, is signed on a four-year contract from French club Metz for an undisclosed fee.
 30 August 2014: Alex Song of Barcelona is signed on a season-long loan and becomes West Ham's eighth signing of the summer transfer window.
 7 November 2014: Manager Sam Allardyce is named Manager of the Month and Diafra Sakho Player of the Month for October 2014.
 28 November 2014: Both West Ham and Everton are fined £20,000 by the FA for failing to control their players, after an on-pitch brawl during the game at Goodison Park on 22 November.
 3 January 2015:  Doneil Henry, a Canada international defender, is signed for an undisclosed fee.
 17 January 2015: Ricardo Vaz Tê has his contract with the club terminated.
 8 February 2015: Ravel Morrison has his contract terminated with immediate effect.
 18 February 2015: Nenê joins the club until the end of the season with an option on 2015–16.
 6 May 2015: Aaron Cresswell is named Hammer of the Year.

Squad

First team squad

Squad statistics 

Players who left the club during the season:

Goalscorers

Disciplinary record 
{| class="wikitable" style="text-align: center; width: 50%"
|-
! rowspan="2" width=15px |
! rowspan="2" width=15px |
! rowspan="2" width=130px |Name
! colspan="3" width=50px |Premier League
! colspan="3" width=50px |FA Cup
! colspan="3" width=50px |League Cup
! colspan="3" width=50px |Total
|-
!  style="width:25px; background:#fe9;"|
!  style="width:28px; background:#ff8888;"|
!  style="width:25px; background:#ff8888;"|
!  style="width:25px; background:#fe9;"|
!  style="width:28px; background:#ff8888;"|
!  style="width:25px; background:#ff8888;"|
!  style="width:25px; background:#fe9;"|
!  style="width:28px; background:#ff8888;"|
!  style="width:25px; background:#ff8888;"|
!  style="width:25px; background:#fe9;"|
!  style="width:28px; background:#ff8888;"|
!  style="width:25px; background:#ff8888;"|
|-
| 1
| 19
|align=left|  James Collins
|3
|1
|0
|0
|0
|0
|0
|0
|0
|3
|1
|0
|-
| 2
| 2
|align=left| Winston Reid
|5
|0
|0
|0
|0
|0
|0
|0
|0
|5
|0
|0
|-
| 3
| 5
|align=left| James Tomkins
|4
|0
|0
|0
|0
|0
|0
|0
|0
|4
|0
|0
|-
| 4
| 3
|align=left| Aaron Cresswell
|2
|0
|0
|0
|0
|0
|0
|0
|0
|2
|0
|0
|-
| 4
| 8
|align=left| Cheikhou Kouyaté
|2
|0
|0
|0
|0
|0
|0
|0
|0
|2
|0
|0
|-
| 4
| 13
|align=left| Adrián
|2
|0
|0
|0
|0
|0
|0
|0
|0
|2
|0
|0
|-
| 4
| 17
|align=left| Joey O'Brien
|2
|0
|0
|0
|0
|0
|0
|0
|0
|2
|0
|0
|-
| 4
| 30
|align=left| Alex Song
|2
|0
|0
|0
|0
|0
|0
|0
|0
|2
|0
|0
|-
| 9
| 14
|align=left| Ravel Morrison
|0
|0
|0
|0
|0
|0
|1
|0
|0
|1
|0
|0
|-
| 9
| 15
|align=left| Diafra Sakho
|1
|0
|0
|0
|0
|0
|0
|0
|0
|1
|0
|0
|-
| 9
| 18
|align=left| Carl Jenkinson
|1
|0
|0
|0
|0
|0
|0
|0
|0
|1
|0
|0
|-
| 9
| 21
|align=left| Morgan Amalfitano
|1
|0
|0
|0
|0
|0
|0
|0
|0
|1
|0
|0
|-
!colspan=3|Total
! 21 !! 1 !! 0 !! 0 !! 0 !! 0 !! 1 !! 0 !! 0 !! 22 !! 1 !! 0

Coaching staff

Pre-season 
West Ham played their first ever games in the country, on a pre-season tour of New Zealand. In July 2014 they played Wellington Phoenix at Eden Park, Auckland on 23 July and Sydney FC at Wellington's Westpac Stadium on 26 July. While in the country, the squad met with a huge fan base, including many from Australia-based supporters group Sydney Hammers. They also competed in the pre-season 2014 Schalke 04 Cup in August in Germany. Other teams competing were Newcastle United, Schalke 04 and Málaga.

On 28 June, it was announced that West Ham would participate in the inaugural Absolute Sports Travel Cup hosted by Football League Two side Cambridge United. They along with the hosts were joined by La Liga side Espanyol and Ukrainian Premier League side Shakhtar Donetsk. The fixtures for the pre-season tournament were released on 2 July, West Ham would face Shakhtar Donetsk on 19 July and Espanyol on 20 July.

Absolute Sports Travel Cup

Football United Tour

Schalke 04 Cup 
Matches were played over 90 minutes, with no added time. If the scores were level, then a penalty shoot-out would determine the winner, gaining two points in the process. Winners within 90 minutes received three points. West Ham were successful from the spot in their first meeting against Schalke 04 but were beaten within 90 minutes by La Liga side Málaga, 2–0.

Marathonbet Cup 
West Ham faced Italian Serie A side Sampdoria in their final pre-season friendly at the Boleyn Ground. They found themselves 0–1 down approaching half time, but a Mark Noble penalty made it 1–1. A fine individual goal from Mohamed Diamé levelled the game at 2–2 in the second half before the winner in the 90th minute, courtesy of youngster Reece Burke.

Competitions

Premier League

August 

West Ham opened the season at home to Tottenham Hotspur, whom they defeated three times last season in all competitions. It was an eventful game, seeing Mark Noble miss a penalty for the first time since 2009. Both sides went down to ten men after James Collins picked up two yellow cards, whilst Kyle Naughton saw straight red for handling the ball in the penalty area. Eric Dier scored his first competitive goal for Spurs in stoppage time to pick up all three points for the North London club. Next up for the Hammers was an away trip to managerless Crystal Palace. Mauro Zárate hit a spectacular volley to register his first West Ham goal and there were also goals from Stewart Downing and Carlton Cole. Senegalese player Diafra Sakho and Diego Poyet, son of Gus, also made their debuts.  Southampton was the next challenge and the last game before the international break. The club unveiled Barcelona and Cameroon midfielder Alex Song before kick off, who joined for a season-long loan. Mark Noble put West Ham a goal up before half time but Southampton scored two second half goals to take all three points back to the South Coast. They finished the month in 11th place.

September 
West Ham played Hull City in their first game during September. A 2–2 draw at the KC Stadium produced a debut goal for Enner Valencia and club debut's for Carl Jenkinson, Morgan Amalfitano and Alex Song. The club's second win of the season came at home to Liverpool. Morgan Amalfitano scored his first goal for the club in a 3–1 win. Despite captain Wayne Rooney seeing red, West Ham could not overcome the ten men of Manchester United, losing 2–1.

October 
The first of a three-game winning streak came at home against struggling QPR in a 2–0 win that saw the club move up to seventh. Diafro Sakho scored his third consecutive league goal. A second-straight win came against promoted side Burnley. Sakho scored his fourth consecutive league goal and helped move West Ham to fourth in the table on the eve of Sam Allardyce's 60th birthday. West Ham secured their third-straight win and a 100% win rate for October in a 2–1 home win against reigning Premier League champions Manchester City. Sakho scored his fifth consecutive league goal and his sixth in a row in all competitions, breaking a club record.

November 
West Ham visited Stoke City and salvaged a point after being 2–0 down to draw 2–2, taking their unbeaten run to four games. Sakho was unable to continue his run of scoring in consecutive matches following an injury sustained in the Manchester City match. Aston Villa was next to visit the Boleyn Ground, a match that ended 0–0. This result extended West Ham's unbeaten run to five games and also saw the return of Andy Carroll following several months out through injury. The club went into the November international break in fourth place.

December 
The visit of Swansea City on 7 December produced a 3–1 win for West Ham, placing them in third place in the Premier League.
On 20 December, West Ham beat Leicester City 2–0 to place them in the top four of the league at Christmas, the first time this has occurred since the 1985–86 season. West Ham lost their next two games, 2–0 away to Chelsea and 1–2 at home to Arsenal to be placed sixth at the end of the calendar year.

January 
West Ham won a single game from four played in January; a 3–0 home win against Hull City. Two draws, against West Bromwich Albion and Swansea City and a defeat at Anfield against Liverpool completed the month's results in the league.

February 
With no wins, three draws, against Manchester United, Southampton and Tottenham Hotspur, and a defeat, against Crystal Palace, in February, West Ham slipped to ninth in the league.

March 
With three league games played in March, West Ham won one, a 1–0 home win against Sunderland with the goal being scored by Diafra Sakho in the 88th minute.

April 
West Ham played four games in April and won none of them. The games included two defeats and two draws including an away defeat to Leicester City, at the time at the bottom of the league.

Matches 
The fixtures for the 2014–15 season were announced on 18 June 2014 at 9am.

Results by matchday

League table

Results summary

Results by matchday

Football League Cup

FA Cup

Transfers

Summer

In

Out

Winter

In

Out

Under-21s

2014–15 U21 Premier League

Squad

Players who left the club during the season

Trialists who made U21 appearances

References

External links 
 West Ham United FC Official Website

West Ham United
West Ham United F.C. seasons
West Ham United
West Ham United